Swiss Open, or Omega European Masters, is the Swiss stop on professional men's golf's European Tour.

Swiss Open may also refer to:
Swiss Open (badminton), an annual badminton tournament
Swiss Open (tennis), a tennis tournament on the ATP Tour
WTA Swiss Open, a former women's tennis tournament
Swiss Open (darts)